Ukara is an island in Lake Victoria. Part of Tanzania, it is located 10 km north of Ukerewe Island, in the Ukerewe District, Mwanza Region. Also known as Bukara.

The island is notable for its unique indigenous system of labor-intensive mixed farming, using advanced agricultural techniques, and a correspondingly high population density.

On 20 September 2018, the MV Nyerere capsized near the island, killing hundreds of people, while plying its route from Ukerewe Island to Ukara Island.

See also 
 Kara people

References

External links 
 Detailed map of Ukerewe and Ukara islands
 Mwanza Guide commented photo gallery of Ukara Island
 "Bukara", New York Times, June 20, 1920. Article on Ukara Island's economy.
 "The Lesson of Ukara", E. Berton Spence, The Free Market (Ludwig von Mises Institute monthly), December 1999.

Lake islands of Tanzania
Islands of Lake Victoria